Amelia Louise Tilghman (surname also spelled Tiligman; 6 September 1856 District of Columbia – 12 December 1931 District of Columbia) (pronounced "TILL man") was a pianist, teacher, and activist who founded the first African-American journal devoted to music, The Musical Messenger, published from 1886 to 1891.

Early life 
Amelia Tilghman was the eldest daughter of Margaret Ann Reynolds (1819-1903) and Henry Hyland Tilgman (1811-1900) who grew up in a free black community class along with her younger sister. As a result from her parent's social class, Amelia Tilghman was awarded the chance to grow up in the comforts amongst those who qualified as the black middle class in the Washington, District of Columbia. Tilghman's family was involved in the church, which nurtured Amelia's musical talents. Margaret Ann Reynolds and Hyland Tilghman applauded their daughter for her natural talents in music that resulted in their daughter being involved with various opportunities. A.L. Tilghman developed profound talents that shed light on musical capabilities pertaining to singing and even her ability to play the piano at a young age. The beauty of Amelia Tilghman's voice moved many figures including Bishop Daniel Alexander Payne of a church based in Washington, also known as the African Methodist Episcopal Church (A.M.E.). It has been reported that Bishop Daniel Alexander Payne even conveyed, "That child's parents had better spend a hundred dollars on her voice now than leave her a fortune when they die" thus illustrating how remarkable Amelia Tilghman's talent truly was in the eyes of powerful organizations. Unfortunately, there has been a lack of information surrounding her early years of music  development.

Once Amelia Tilghman reached her adult years, she decided to enroll in the Normal School of Howard University, also graduating in 1870. A.L. Tilghman then accepted a full-time job as a teacher in the black Georgetown public schools in 1870. After fourteen years, she relocated to Boston where she studied music pedagogy with Samuel Jamieson (1855–1930) at the Boston Conservatory of Music, though she never graduated with a degree.

In addition to her work as a teacher, Tilghman pursued a career as a pianist. She performed at Steinway Hall in Manhattan, New York, in 1880 and was described by a reviewer as "a musical star of the first magnitude." The following year, she was the invited soloist at Saengerfest, a festival at the Grand Opera House in Louisville, Kentucky. There, she heard a choral work of William Batchelder Bradbury, Esther, the Beautiful Queen and was so enamored that she decided to organize, direct, and star in a production of the piece in Washington, D.C. The performance, at Thanksgiving, 1881, was hailed as “a grand success,” for it proved that “there is talent which needs but to be intelligently and thoroughly trained to produce really artistic performances.”

Move to Alabama and journalism
In early 1886, for reasons unknown, Tilghman relocated to Montgomery, Alabama, where she took a job in the public schools. When she arrived, reflected a journalist, looking back from 1893, “there were no colored pianists in Montgomery, and in no house where colored people lived did one hear in passing the artistic rendition of music as is now heard in almost every two or three squares.” During her first year in town, Amelia organized a recital of her students in a local Congregational Church.

In Montgomery, Tilghman founded the first African-American music journal, a monthly publication called The Musical Messenger. This entrée into journalism was not easy for her, as men dominated the field at the time and for years after women reported facing prejudice. The journal's tagline was “the highest moral, social and intellectual interest of the people.” The two surviving issues of the publication—both from 1889—focus on educating its readers about music history (such as the biography of Haydn), church choir repertoire, and sharing and circulating the names and work of African-American composers. “That the race stands sadly in need of such a journal should be freely admitted. It is our earnest hope that the educator's hands may be strengthened and her soul fortified in this very creditable venture,” wrote the Philadelphia Tribune.

Tilghman returned permanently to Washington, D.C., to assist with the care of her seriously ill mother in 1888.  There, she hired the musician and teacher Lucinda B. Bragg Adams (1870-1932) as an associate editor for The Musical Messenger. While roundly celebrated, the publication was not profitable.

Tilghman discontinued the publication and refocused her energies on teaching after 1891.  She died in 1931.

References

External links 
 "Amelia Telghman," Encyclopedia of Alabama

1856 births
1931 deaths
Howard University alumni
American magazine publishers (people)
African-American women writers
20th-century African-American women singers
Singers from Washington, D.C.
Journalists from Washington, D.C.
19th-century American women writers
19th-century American journalists
19th-century American women singers
19th-century American singers